Harry Lee "Hal" Mefford (June 18, 1882 – December 24, 1932) was an American football player, coach of football and basketball, and college athletics administrator. He played for the Chicago Maroons football team in 1905 and 1906 and was the first athletic director of the Rose Polytechnic Institute in Terre Haute, Indiana.  He was the head football coach for the Kendall Orange and Black football team during the 1917 season.  In his only season as the head coach, the Orange and Black compiled a 0–8–1 record and were outscored by their opponents by a combined total of 221 to 61.

Head coaching record

Football

References

External links

1882 births
1932 deaths
American football ends
American football halfbacks
Chicago Maroons football players
Rose–Hulman Fightin' Engineers athletic directors
Rose–Hulman Fightin' Engineers football coaches
Tulsa Golden Hurricane football coaches
Tulsa Golden Hurricane men's basketball coaches